Gloria Ángela Bertha Lavara Mejía (born 9 December 1971) is a Mexican politician affiliated with the Ecologist Green Party of Mexico. As of 2014 she served as Senator of the LVIII and LIX Legislatures of the Mexican Congress representing the Federal District and as Deputy of the LVII and LX Legislatures.

References

1971 births
Living people
Politicians from Mexico City
Women members of the Senate of the Republic (Mexico)
Members of the Senate of the Republic (Mexico)
Members of the Chamber of Deputies (Mexico)
Presidents of the Chamber of Deputies (Mexico)
Ecologist Green Party of Mexico politicians
21st-century Mexican politicians
21st-century Mexican women politicians
Women members of the Chamber of Deputies (Mexico)
Women legislative speakers
Universidad Anáhuac México alumni
20th-century Mexican politicians
20th-century Mexican women politicians